Iron Flower is a 1958 Hungarian drama film directed by János Herskó. It was entered into the 1958 Cannes Film Festival.

Plot
The story takes place in Óbuda in the 1930s. István Pettersen is a well-meaning, excellent fabric dyer, yet unemployed and homeless. He pulls himself into a miserable hut set on an abandoned plot and devotes his life from casual work. He meets and spends some happy days in the viscose with the orphaned Vera, who works at the local laundromat but dreams that, like her mother, she will one day be a dancer. Her boss, the wealthy Mr. Weiszhaupt, had long looked her in, and when the girl arrives late for work, he blackmails her.

Cast
 Mari Törőcsik - Cink Vera
 István Avar - Pettersen István
 Zoltán Várkonyi
 Margit Dajka - Racsákné (as Dayka Margit)
 Manyi Kiss - Veronika
 Ildikó Szabó - Anni
 Hédi Váradi - Emmike
 Béla Barsi - Gedeon
 Zoltán Gera - Novák
 János Rajz - Koldus
 Gyula Szabó - Motyó
 Piri Peéry - Ilcsi madame
 Anni Soltész - Berta
 László Bánhidi - Józsi bácsi (as Bánhidy László)
 György Győrffy - Franci
 László Kozák - Szepi
 Sándor Pethes - Dr. Beck
 Ernő Szabó - Fischer
 Tibor Illés - Róbertke

References

External links

1958 films
1950s Hungarian-language films
1958 drama films
Films directed by János Herskó
Hungarian drama films